Miss Grand Cambodia is an annual female beauty pageant in Cambodia, founded in 2015 by BKA Entertainment chaired by a Thai businessperson in Cambodia Boonkerd Angamnuaysiri, the finalists of the contest have been sent to participate in various international contests including its parent stage, Miss Grand International. In present Miss Grand Cambodia has been managing by Sokunthea Im, HK7 Co., Ltd. Also known as a National director and president of Miss Grand Cambodia 2023 support by Sarapich Som as a Vice president and Sokpoly Voeun as a Project director of Miss Grand Cambodia 2023. The pageant patent was transferred to a Phnom Penh-based event organizer managed by Sophin In in 2020, Mohahang Production, and then to a cosmetics and dietary supplement retailer, HK 7 Co., Ltd., headed by Sokunthea Im, in 2023.

Since the establishment of Miss Grand International, to date, Cambodian representatives have never won the contest. However, two placements was recorded in 2020 and 2021, when Chily Tevy and Sothida Pokimtheng were placed among the top 20 and top 10 finalists, respectively.

Background

History
After the first participation at Miss Grand International by the appointed representative Tim Srey Niet in 2014, the Cambodian licensee subsequently ran its first competition in the following year. The contest was held at Nagaworld Hotel Grand Ballroom, which functioned as the final venue of the Miss Grand Cambodia pageant from 2015 – 2019, featuring 24 national finalists directly chosen by the national organizer, of which, a 22-year-old third-year medical student Seng Polvithavy was announced the winner, and the pageant was held annually since then.

BKA Entertainment lost the contest license to Mohahang Production in 2020, after failing to send the 2019 titleholder, Det Sreyneat, to participate at Miss Grand International 2019 in Venezuela, as a result of insufficient time to prepare the documents for the visa application; the winner was crowned on late September, but the international pageant was launched on early October. Such an incident also happened in 2016.

Under the management of Mohahang Production, the pageant result was canceled in 2020, when the original winner, Seng Rotha, opted not to compete in the international pageant and renounced the title. Furthermore, the first runner-up, Lim Sotheavy, also refused to take over the title due to the health conditions, which causes the organizer to file a lawsuit against them for not fulfilling the agreement, and subsequently appointed Chily Tevy, the second runner-up, to join the international pageant instead.

In 2023, Sokunthea Im, owner of HK7 Co., Ltd, in collaboration with D-Creator, was legally licensed to host the Miss Grand Cambodia 2023, which was recognized and publicly announced by the international parent organ on January 2, 2023. The contest was programmed to be directed by Sokunthea Im as a national director, Sarapich Som as vice president and Sokpoly Voeun, CEO of D-creator, as project director.

Editions
The following list is the edition detail of the Miss Grand Cambodia contest, since its inception in 2015.

Selection of contestants
Under the management of BKA Entertainment, the national aspirants for its first five editions were directly chosen by the central organizer based in Phnom Penh. However, after the pageant license was transferred to a new organizer, Mohahang Production, in 2020, an attempt to distribute to the provincial organs has been observed ever since. Moreover, Cambodian overseas, such as Khmer Krom, Khmer Loeu, French-Cambodians, etc., have been allowed to participate in the contest with independent sash title since 2020, nevertheless, most of the candidates were still directly selected and appointed the provincial titles by the national organizer due to a lacking of regional licensees.

Titleholders

Early era: No provincial titles

Current era: Provincial titles assigned

Winner gallery

International competition

The main finalists of the Miss Grand Cambodia pageant have been sent to represent the country in various international contests, the following is a list of international contests, with participants from Miss Grand Cambodia as contestants based on the year the pageant was held.
Colors key

National finalists
The following list is the national finalists of the Miss Grand Cambodia pageant, as well as the competition results.
Color keys
 Declared as the winner
 Ended as a runner-up 
 Ended as a semi-finalist 
 Ended as a Quaterfinalist 
 Did not participate

2015–2019: No provincial title

2020–2022: Provincial representatives

References

External links

 

Cambodia
Beauty pageants in Cambodia
Recurring events established in 2015
2015 establishments in Cambodia
Cambodian awards